Halfdan Jønsson  (15 May 1891 – 7 February 1945) was a Norwegian trade unionist and resistance member. He was born in Frol. He was elected chairman of the Norwegian Union of Chemical Industry Workers in 1924. In 1934 he served as vice chairman of the Norwegian Confederation of Trade Unions, until November. He died in the Dachau concentration camp in 1945.

References

1891 births
1945 deaths
People from Levanger
Norwegian resistance members
Norwegian trade unionists
Norwegian
Dachau